Darío Ezequiel Fernández, (born 24 September 1978). Is a retired Argentine footballer who played in Argentina, Chile, Greece, Israel and Cyprus. Ex Futbolista profesional. Quién jugó en países como : Argentina, Chile, Grecia, Israel y Chipre. Actualmente es entrenador de fútbol formativo en Estados Unidos.

Honours

Club

_ Olimpo de Bahía Blanca.
_ National Champion Division 2 . 
Promotion to  Division 1 Argentine Superleague.   Season (2001 )

_ Quilmes AC 
_ Promotion to Division 1 Argentine Superleague  Season  (2002/ 03 ) 

Beitar Jerusalem  Israel

Israel State Cup (1) : Winner 2009

References
 zerozero.eu
 Player CV  
 Darío Fernández at BDFA.com.ar 

1978 births
Living people
Sportspeople from Buenos Aires Province
Argentine footballers
Argentine expatriate footballers
Independiente Rivadavia footballers
Olimpo footballers
Quilmes Atlético Club footballers
Godoy Cruz Antonio Tomba footballers
Chacarita Juniors footballers
Panionios F.C. players
Cobreloa footballers
Beitar Jerusalem F.C. players
Aris Thessaloniki F.C. players
Alki Larnaca FC players
Hapoel Haifa F.C. players
Hapoel Afula F.C. players
Super League Greece players
Football League (Greece) players
Israeli Premier League players
Liga Leumit players
Cypriot First Division players
Expatriate footballers in Chile
Expatriate footballers in Greece
Expatriate footballers in Israel
Association football midfielders
Argentine expatriate sportspeople in Israel
Expatriate footballers in Cyprus
Argentine expatriate sportspeople in Cyprus